Nattrass may refer to:

Surname
Floyd Nattrass (1918–2004), Canadian sports shooter
Harry Nattrass (1898–unknown), English football referee
Irving Nattrass (born 1952), English former footballer
Mike Nattrass (born 1945), British politician
Nicoli Nattrass, University of Cape Town economist
Peter Nattrass (born 1941), Australian gynaecologist, businessman and politician
Ralph Nattrass (1925–2014), Canadian ice hockey player

Other
Tesco Supermarkets Ltd v Nattrass, a 1971 House of Lords decision

See also
Clive Nattress (born 1951), English former footballer